Vasundhara Kashyap is an Indian actress and model in Tamil language films.

Career 
Vasundhara was born to a Tamil father and a Maharashtriann mother. She first appeared in the 2006 Tamil film, Vattaram and later starred in films including Kaalaipani, Jeyamkondaan and Peraanmai. She took part in the Miss Chennai contest and was crowned Miss Creativity, following which she took up modelling. She changed her name to Vasundhara Kashyap while filming Thenmerku Paruvakaartru.

oted.

Filmography 

 All films are in Tamil, unless otherwise noted.

References

External links

Living people
Actresses in Tamil cinema
Tamil actresses
Female models from Delhi
Actresses from New Delhi
Indian film actresses
Actresses in Telugu cinema
21st-century Indian actresses
Year of birth missing (living people)